The 2018–19 Coppin State Eagles men's basketball team represented Coppin State University in the 2018–19 NCAA Division I men's basketball season. They played their home games at the Physical Education Complex in Baltimore, Maryland, and were led by 2nd-year head coach Juan Dixon.

Previous season
The Eagles finished the 2017–18 season 5–27, 5–11 in MEAC play to finish in 11th place. They lost in the first round of the MEAC tournament to North Carolina Central.

Roster

Schedule and results

|-
!colspan=12 style=| Non-Conference Regular season

|-
!colspan=12 style=| MEAC regular season

|-
!colspan=12 style=| MEAC tournament
|-

|-

Source

References

Coppin State Eagles men's basketball seasons
Coppin State Eagles
Coppin State Eagles men's basketball team
Coppin State Eagles men's basketball team